The Fly is a 1967 Yugoslavian cartoon.

Plot
A man is standing in the scene when a fly arrives and begins to irritate him. He tries to swat the fly, but it keeps growing bigger to the point where it shatters the scene. Eventually, the man and the fly decide to negotiate.

Creators
Written by: Vatroslav Mimica
Backgrounds: Pavao Štalter
Drawings: Aleksandar Marks
Animation: Vladimir Jutriša
Assistant Director: Darko Gospodnetić
Cinematography: Ivan Hercigonja
Sound Recording: Mladen Prebil
Music Supervision: Tea Brunšmid
Directed by: Aleksandar Marks, Vladimir Jutriša

External links

References

1968 films
1968 animated films
1960s animated short films
Yugoslav animated short films
Zagreb Film films
Croatian animated short films
Animated films about insects
Animated films without speech
Films about flies